Los Coyotes Band of Cahuilla and Cupeño Indians of the Los Coyotes Reservation is a federally recognized tribe of Cahuilla and Cupeño Indians, who were Mission Indians located in California.

Reservation
Los Coyotes Reservation is located in northeastern San Diego County. Of 400 enrolled tribal members, about 74 live on the reservation. It was founded in 1889.

Their reservation is the largest in San Diego County. An  drive from San Diego, the land is located between Anza-Borrego Desert State Park and the Cleveland National Forest. Hot Springs Mountain is located within the boundaries of the reservation with an elevation of 6,533 ft. Campgrounds are open to the public for a nominal entry fee.

Government
Los Coyotes Band of Cahuilla and Cupeño Indians is headquartered in Warner Springs, California. It is governed by a democratically elected tribal council. Its current tribal spokesperson is Ray Chapparosa.

Language
The Cahuilla and Cupeño languages are closely related and are part of the Takic language family. The Cupeño and Cahuilla languages are endangered. Alvino Siva, an enrolled tribal member and a fluent Cahuilla language speaker, died on June 26, 2009. He preserved the tribe's traditional bird songs, sung in the Cahuilla language, by teaching them to younger generations of Cahuilla people.

Notable tribal members
 Katherine Siva Saubel (March 7, 1920 – November 1, 2011), scholar of Indian language and culture, co-founder of the Malki Museum, and former Los Coyotes tribal chairperson

Notes

References
 Eargle, Jr., Dolan H. California Indian Country: The Land and the People. San Francisco: Tree Company Press, 1992. .
 Pritzker, Barry M. A Native American Encyclopedia: History, Culture, and Peoples. Oxford: Oxford University Press, 2000. .

Further reading

External links
 Los Coyotes Band contacts
 Los Coyotes Band reservation description

Cahuilla
Cupeno
California Mission Indians
Native American tribes in California
Federally recognized tribes in the United States
Native American tribes in San Diego County, California
Warner Springs, California